Sanskaar - Dharohar Apnon Ki ( Values - our legacy) is a 2013 Indian soap opera that was broadcast on Colors TV. The first season of the show aired weeknights from 14 January 2013 to 12 September 2013. Season 2 began airing 7 October 2013 and the show ended on 30 April 2014.

This Serial was dubbed into Tamil as Gouravam and was telecasted on Raj TV. Both the seasons were telecasted continuously without a break between them.

Series overview

Plot summary
Sanskaar — Dharohar Apnon Ki is the story of Jai Kishan, the dedicated and cultured son of the Vaishnav family that lives in Keshavgarh. He wants to stay with his family, but situations force him to leave his home and go to the US. The show will deal with his stay in a foreign land, and how he keeps his tradition close to his heart even when he's away from his homeland. Jai Kishan Vaishnav meets another Gujarati, Urmila Patel at a Lord Krishna temple in the US. His struggles continue with the loss of his luggage. Looking for his missing luggage, Jai Kishan reaches the office where he has to join. A policeman informs the Vaishnavs that burning of their mill was not an accident. Meanwhile, Jai Kishan struggles to join his job without the documents. His boss cancels his work permit and he doesn't have any option except marrying an American citizen. He later marries Bhoomi and Bhoomi passed all the tests conducted by Ansu Baa and was finally accepted by the family

In season 2,Bhoomi gets pregnant and meets with an accident and dies along with the child. Jai gets engaged to childhood friend Deepika but marries Dhara for his protection. Although they are in a contract marriage, Dhara becomes pregnant with Jai's child but keeps it a secret while Deepika tells Jai she's pregnant with his child too. Both pregnancies come to light in front of the rest of the family. Dhara lies about the identity of the father of her child and Jai is forced to marry Deepika as soon as the contract ends. Deepika pretends that she is pregnant with Jai’s child. On the wedding day, it is revealed that she is not pregnant and Jai decides to stay with Dhara who finally admits that the baby she's carrying is his. Deepika shoots Dhara in a fit of jealousy but Dhara and her child are both fine.

Cast

 Jay Soni - Jai Kishan Vaishnav
 Tejasswi Prakash - Dhara  Vaishnav
 Shamin Mannan - Bhoomi Vaishnav
 Farhad Shahnawaz - Rammy
 Swapna Waghmare Joshi - Urmila Patel / Urmi
 Sujata Sanghamitra - Gayatri
 Aruna Irani - Anusuya Vaishnav / Ansu Baa
 Rasik Dave - Karsandas  Vaishnav
 Sonali Sachdev - Parul Karsandas  Vaishnav
 Rajendra Chawla - Hasmukhlal  Vaishnav
 Chhaya Vora - Ramila Vaishnav
 Kartik Soni - Dilip Vaishnav
 Ketkie Jain - Avni
 Shresth Kumar - Avni's husband
 Spandan Chaturvedi - Aarvi Vaishnav
 Devyansh Tapuriah - Nanku
 Pooja Kanwal Mahtani- Deepika
 Yashashri Masurkar / Supriya Kumari - Bharati
 Daisy Irani - Rukmini / Motiben
 Krunal Pandit - Mayank
 Avinash Mukherjee - Ankit Vaishnav
 Arbaaz Ali Khan - Amritlal
 Ram Kapoor - Parmeshwar Patel Kapoor / Paddy
   Ahmad Harhash Raj Pratap Rathore 
 Hemant Thatte - Shaukat

Other versions
This serial is  also broadcast as Dil Ki Pukar on the Rishtey network.

References

External links
 Official Website

Colors TV original programming
Indian television soap operas
2013 Indian television series debuts
2014 Indian television series endings